The DFS Seeadler (Sea Eagle) was a German flying boat sailplane designed by Hans Jacobs of the Deutsche Forschungsanstalt für Segelflug (DFS).  It was version of the 1935 DFS Rhönadler, with a new fuselage and strongly gulled wings to keep them clear from spray.  The aircraft was first flown in the summer of 1935, test piloted by Hanna Reitsch, and towed by a Dornier Do 12.

Specifications

References

1930s German sailplanes
Seeadler
Glider aircraft
Gull-wing aircraft
Aircraft first flown in 1936